The Palladio Award is an architectural prize given annually for "creative interpretation or adaptation of design principles developed through 2,500 years of the Western architectural tradition". The Awards, in  several categories, are presented by the Traditional Building Magazine, Period Homes Magazine, and the Traditional Building Conference. 

The Palladio is a "coveted" architectural prize given for excellence in traditional design. It is the only national award in the United States given for excellence in classical design.

References

Architecture awards
New Classical architecture